Melanoxylum is the genus for a yellow-flowered, Brauna tree of Brazil.

References

Cassieae
Fabaceae genera